Ciyutuo (茨榆坨镇) may refer to the following locations in China:

 Ciyutuo, Hebei
 Ciyutuo, Liaoning, town in Liaozhong County